Peter James Shannon (born 1949 in Melbourne, Australia) was Australian Ambassador to Austria between 2006 and 2009.

Peter holds a Bachelor of Laws and a Bachelor of Arts degree from the University of Sydney. He is married and has one son. Apart from English, he speaks French and Bislama, a Melanesian creole language.

Prior to his appointment as ambassador to Austria in 2006, Peter was Assistant Secretary, Arms Control and Counter-Proliferation Branch, Department of Foreign Affairs and Trade (2002–2005). Among the other positions Peter has held in the Australian Department of Foreign Affairs and Trade are Assistant Secretary, Americas Branch (1999–2002), Deputy Legal Adviser, Legal Branch (1991–1992), Director, Multilateral Law Section (1989–1990) and Director, Law of the Sea Section (1984–1986).

Peter has held a number of position overseas, including Permanent Delegate to UNESCO, Australian Embassy and Permanent Mission to UNESCO, Paris (1996–1999) and High Commissioner to the Republic of Vanuatu (1992–1996).

References

1949 births
Living people
Australian public servants
Permanent Delegates of Australia to UNESCO
Ambassadors of Australia to Austria
Permanent Representatives of Australia to the United Nations Office in Vienna
High Commissioners of Australia to Vanuatu